This is a list of railway stations in the Brussels-Capital Region in Belgium. The municipality of each station is also listed. There are 35 stations in the Brussels-Capital Region, 8 of which bear the name Brussels. All stations listed are correct to February 2021.

Because the Brussels-Capital Region is officially bilingual, the stations and municipalities with a dutch name and a french name will be written: (dutch name)/(french name).

Stations

Municipal statistics

References

Brussels
 
Railway stations